Declan Barron (born 1951) is an Irish former Gaelic football player who played for club side Bantry Blues, divisional side Carbery and at inter-county level with the Cork senior football team. He usually lined out at midfield or in the forwards.

Career

Barron, whose father had played with the Carlow senior football team, first played Gaelic football at Bantry National school and from there he moved to play at club level with Bantry Blues. He won the first of four divisional championship titles in 1968, before later claiming county titles in junior and intermediate. He completed the county set of medals by winning a County Senior Championship title with Carbery in 1971. By this stage Barron had already made an impression on the inter-county scene with Cork and was the holder of two All-Ireland minor championship medals and two All-Ireland under-21 championship medals. He was added to the Cork senior team in 1971 and won the first of three Munster Championship medals that year. Barron was at centre-forward when Cork claimed the All-Ireland title after a defeat of Galway in the final. He continued to line out with Cork for much of the following decade and ended his career by winning a National League medal. Having won two All-Star awards during his playing days, Barron was later named on the Cork Football Teams of the Century and Millennium.

Honours

Bantry Blues
Cork Intermediate Football Championship: 1975
Cork Junior Football Championship: 1972
South West Junior A Football Championship: 1968, 1969, 1972, 1985

Carbery
Cork Senior Football Championship: 1971

Cork
All-Ireland Senior Football Championship: 1973
Munster Senior Football Championship: 1971, 1973, 1974
National Football League: 1979–80
All-Ireland Under-21 Football Championship: 1970, 1971
Munster Under-21 Football Championship: 1970, 1971
All-Ireland Minor Football Championship: 1968, 1969
Munster Minor Football Championship: 1968, 1969

Munster
Railway Cup:1975

References

1951 births
Living people
Bantry Blues Gaelic footballers
Carbery Gaelic footballers
Cork inter-county Gaelic footballers
Munster inter-provincial Gaelic footballers
People from Bantry